The Mother-32 is a semi-modular analog synthesizer. Introduced in 2015, it was the first tabletop unit produced by Moog Music. It has a single voltage controlled audio oscillator, a voltage controlled low frequency oscillator, a voltage controlled filter switchable between high and low pass, an AR envelope generator with switchable sustain, a voltage controlled amplifier, and a white noise generator. It also features a 32–step monophonic sequencer, a 13-note keypad, and a 32-point patch bay including assignable outputs. The Mother-32 is manufactured in Asheville, North Carolina.

Expandability
The unit has a MIDI input and CV outputs, and can act as a MIDI-to-CV converter. The Mother-32 can also be integrated into a Eurorack skiff or case. Moog also produces 2- and 3-tier racks for mounting multiple Mother-32s, DFAMs, or Moog's Eurorack case.

Construction
The Mother-32 case is constructed from aluminum with wooden sides.

See also
 List of Moog synthesizer players
 Moog synthesizer
 Robert Moog

Notes

External links 
Manufacturer's web page

Moog synthesizers
Monophonic synthesizers
Analog synthesizers